Daniel Steven Devine (born 4 September 1997) is an English professional footballer who plays as a midfielder for Farsley Celtic, on loan from Chester.

Early and personal life
Devine was born in the Bradford Royal Infirmary and attended St Bede's Grammar School in the city. He was a boyhood Bradford City fan.

Career

Bradford City
Devine began his career with Bradford City, joining at under-13 level, and signing his first professional contract in June 2016. He spent a loan spell at Harrogate Railway Athletic earlier that year.

He made his senior debut for the club on 6 August 2016 in the opening league game of the 2016–17 season, in a march against Port Vale.

He signed a new contract with the club in October 2016, until June 2019. He stated he hoped that his progress with the first-team would act as an inspiration to other young players at the club.

He did not play between March and November 2018 due to injury, making his first appearance of the 2018–19 season as a late substitute in an FA Cup game on 10 November 2018. In April 2019,having made no further first-team appearances, new manager Gary Bowyer said Devine was in "contention" for more games. After returning to first-team action, including his first start in two years on 27 April 2019, Devine said he wanted to help the club's promotion push in the 2019–20 season.

In May 2019, following Bradford City's relegation to League Two, he was one of 3 first-team players to be offered a new contract by the club. Later that month he signed a new one-year contract with the club. He said he hoped the club's relegation would be a new start for the club.

On 19 October 2019 he scored his first goal for Bradford City in a 2–1 league victory at home to Crawley Town. Manager Gary Bowyer said it provided a confidence boost for Devine, and that he hoped Devine had more to offer. On 22 October 2019, in a match against Port Vale, Devine was the only Bradford City player still with the club from when the two teams previously met for his debut in August 2016. In November 2019 he said he was keen to work with and inspire Bradford City's youth players.

On 26 May 2020 it was announced that he was one of 10 players who would leave Bradford City when their contract expired on 30 June 2020. After leaving the club he said that he was "disappointed" how his time at the club ended and that he was looking forward to finding a new club and playing more games.

Carlisle United
Devine signed for Carlisle United on 6 August 2020 following his release from Bradford City. In December 2020 he said he was looking forward to returning to Bradford to play against his former club. Devine was released by the club at the end of the 2021–22 season.

Non-league
He signed for Chester in August 2022. He moved to Farsley Celtic in February 2023.

Career statistics

References

1997 births
Living people
People educated at St. Bede's Grammar School
Footballers from Bradford
English footballers
Bradford City A.F.C. players
Harrogate Railway Athletic F.C. players
Carlisle United F.C. players
Chester F.C. players
Farsley Celtic F.C. players
English Football League players
Association football midfielders
National League (English football) players